is a Japanese former training barque. She was built by Kawasaki Shipbuilding Corporation in Kobe, and was launched on 27 January 1930 alongside her sister ship Nippon Maru.  She was operated by the Tokyo Institute for Maritime Training to train officers for Japan's merchant marine.  At the beginning of World War II, her sailing rig was removed and she served as a training and postwar transport motorship.  In 1955, her rig was reinstalled and she resumed her training voyages until she was replaced in 1989 by her successor, also named Kaiwo Maru. In August 1955 the ship was filmed by Mike Todd for the movie Around the World in 80 Days. She is now a museum ship located in Imizu, Toyama.

Her gross tonnage is 2,286. She is rigged as a four-masted barque, with 32 sails covering , and two 600-horsepower diesel engines for auxiliary functions. During her career as a training ship, she was manned by a crew of 27 officers, 48 seamen, and 120 trainees.

References

1930 ships
Museum ships in Japan
Ships built by Kawasaki Heavy Industries
Merchant ships of Japan
Training ships of Japan
Tall ships of Japan